Larfleeze, also known as Agent Orange, is a  supervillain appearing in comics published by DC Comics, usually as an antagonist in books featuring Green Lantern and the Green Lantern Corps. He is the primary wielder of the orange light of avarice, derived from the emotional spectrum of greed, and does not voluntarily allow others to wield it. Hal Jordan refers to him at first as "Gonzo" because of his resemblance to the Muppet of the same name. 

The character first appeared in DC Universe #0 (April 2008), and was created by writer Geoff Johns and artist Ethan Van Sciver.

Publication history
Writer Geoff Johns developed Larfleeze as a key participant in the "Blackest Night" storyline, explaining at Comic Con International 2009 that he came up with the name "Larfleeze" by combining the words "lard" and "sleaze". Johns also revealed that the Claim Jumper restaurant chain was his inspiration behind writing about greed. Johns states that Larfleeze is one of his favorite characters to write because of how "out of touch" the character is, adding that, other than greed, emotions have no value to him because they do not provide him with anything material. After his brief first appearance in DC Universe #0 (April 2008), the character went on to be shown in smaller teaser appearances within the Green Lantern series until his first extended appearance in Green Lantern #39 (April 2009). The issue leads into "Agent Orange" (named after the codename Larfleeze is given by the Guardians of the Universe), the storyline detailing the character's origin that also serves as a prelude to the "Blackest Night" storyline. Larfleeze's story includes an appearance in Blackest Night: Tales of the Corps #2 (July 2009). In the story Tales of the Orange Lanterns: Blume Godhead, he is shown "recruiting" one of his most recognizable Orange Lanterns.

Larfleeze received a back-up in Threshold, written by Keith Giffen, with art by Scott Kolins. The back-up ran from Threshold #1 (March 2013) to #5 (July 2013). The plot focused on the apparent theft of Larfleeze's power battery, and his attempt to retrieve it. The back-up spins off into a self-titled ongoing series, Larfleeze. Keith Giffen and Scott Kolins continued as the creative team, with J. M. DeMatteis introduced as co-writer. In March 2014, DC announced that the Larfleeze series would end with issue 12.

Fictional character biography

Origin
Larfleeze (also known as Agent Orange to those who wield power from the emotional spectrum) is the first and for a long time the only individual to wield the power of the orange light. Little is known about his past except that he comes from an incredibly long-lived species, as Larfleeze is said to be over several billion years old. He was taken from his parents for reasons yet to be revealed and forced to work as a slave. His time as a slave was cruel and harsh: his cruel and sadistic masters starved Larfleeze and his fellow slaves to weed out those too weak to work in the hellish conditions they were forced to toil in. This cruelty and deprivation of even the most basic rights and privileges deeply affected Larfleeze, who at some point began to "hear" the material possessions in the society of the people whom he served begging him to own them. Some time much later, Larfleeze escaped and became a wanted criminal, along with several of his species.

Billions of years ago, Larfleeze belonged to a small guild of thieves which stole a number of artifacts from the planet Maltus, including a mysterious box supposedly worth an entire star system to the right buyer. In retaliation, the Guardians of the Universe sent their Manhunters to pursue them. Those that escaped discovered a map belonging to the Guardian Krona that told of treasure. The guild followed the map into the Vega System to the planet Okaara. There they discovered a temple, inside of which was a Power Battery containing the orange light of avarice. Feeling its power "speak" to them, the criminals fought amongst themselves for it. Eventually the Guardians and their Manhunters found them, however, because of its proximity to Larfleeze and the others, the Guardians could not get within reaching distance of the box.

The Guardians and Manhunters who tried were incinerated by the Orange Light of Avarice. Fearing the power of the orange light, the Guardians offered the two surviving guild members (Larfleeze and Turpa) a deal: in exchange for the mysterious box, the Guardians would trade the orange light with two additional conditions. First, as long as the orange light remained within the Vega system, the Guardians would agree not to interfere with it. Then secondly, for the safety of others, only one of the two thieves would be allowed to keep the orange light for themselves. Larfleeze explained that the Guardians were desperate to get the box back because it contained the fear entity Parallax. Agreeing to these terms, the two guild members fought to the death for the right to own the orange light, and Larfleeze emerged victorious.

Agent Orange
In Green Lantern vol. 4, issue #28 (April 2009), the Controllers are shown discussing their previous failures in forming a force matching the Green Lantern Corps. They soon became interested in pursuing a comparable power source to the green light that they've discovered: the orange light. The Controllers follow the orange light to Okaara where they descend into an underground palace and eventually come across the orange lantern power battery deep inside. As soon as they try to take it, the Controllers are overcome by Larfleeze's Orange Lanterns and are slaughtered.

Larfleeze is enraged at this perceived violation of the agreement he has with the Guardians, as he is unable to see a distinction between them and the Controllers. At the time, Green Lantern Stel pursues a member of the Sinestro Corps, but is given pause when he crosses into the Vega system for sanctuary. Not willing to be stopped (despite the fact that Green Lanterns are barred from entering the system), Stel continues after his target. Upon entering the system, the Sinestro Corps member is devoured by Agent Orange's construct of Blume. Blume captures and seriously damages Stel, branding him with the symbol of the Orange Lantern Corps. When the Green Lanterns recover Stel and return him to Oa, a construct of Larfleeze bursts forth from the brand and confronts the Guardians about the attempt to steal the orange battery. Although the Guardians point out that the Controllers are the source of his anger, Larfleeze refuses to listen. He declares the treaty is null and void, and that the Guardians will submit to his demands or face his wrath. In response, the Guardian Scar destroys the projection and states that the Guardians do not negotiate with terrorists.

This conflict marks the beginning of Green Lantern'''s next phase in its prelude to the "Blackest Night" crossover, titled: "Agent Orange". The story goes on to show the Guardians adding a fourth law to the Book of Oa: the Vega system is no longer outside of Green Lantern jurisdiction. This allows the Guardians and the Green Lantern Corps to begin an assault on Vega. Hal Jordan, a new recipient of a blue power ring created by Ganthet and Sayd, is included in the assault team. Upon arriving on Okaara, the Green Lanterns are met with opposition from Larfleeze's Orange Lantern constructs. They are alarmed to find that their green light powers have little effect on the Orange Lanterns and are absorbed into them. Gretti, a nomadic Green Lantern, is slain and his form is taken into Larfleeze's service. During the fight, Jordan is separated from the group and comes face-to-face with Agent Orange. Larfleeze, upon seeing Jordan's blue ring, immediately wants it for himself. Larfleeze touches the ring in his desire for it and is forced back by the power of the blue light (the ring itself claiming that "hope is selfless"). This enrages Larfleeze, who bargains with Jordan over it. Though Jordan agrees to give the ring to Larfleeze, he finds he is unable to remove it. Not finding this to be an acceptable answer, Larfleeze creates an axe from orange light and seemingly removes Jordan's hand by force. No longer attached to Jordan, the blue power ring welcomes Larfleeze to the Blue Lantern Corps. For a moment the constant hunger he feels as Agent Orange is pacified, however it is quickly revealed that this is a ruse created by the blue ring, in response to Larfleeze's hope for relief. Jordan, hand actually intact, returns to battle Larfleeze with the Green Lantern Corps. During the battle, Jordan is possessed by the overwhelming orange power of avarice after briefly seizing Larfleeze's power battery (assuming that by stealing it, Larfleeze would no longer be able to power his army of constructs). Unfortunately, it's explained that Larfleeze has been in contact with the orange battery for so long that it's as much a part of him as the main power battery in Oa is a part of the Guardians.

Jordan is able to subdue Larfleeze by finally gaining control over his blue power ring. The Guardians realize that if they take the battery from Larfleeze, someone else will inevitably find it, becoming a new Agent Orange. Preferring to know where Agent Orange is, they decide to negotiate with Larfleeze once more. The details of the negotiation aren't fully revealed; however it is shown that Larfleeze asks the Guardians where he can find a blue power ring. The issue ends with Larfleeze launching an assault on the Blue Lantern Corps by sending a group of his Orange Lantern constructs to Odym. Though Larfleeze remains on Okaara (observing the progress of the conflict through his central power battery), he sends a construct of himself to accompany his Orange Lanterns.Blackest Night: Tales of the Corps #1 (July 2009)

Blackest Night

At the onset of the "Blackest Night" storyline, a new Corps powered by death (rather than a light of the emotional spectrum) is introduced to the DC Universe: the Black Lantern Corps. As the other seven Corps battle one another, Black Hand releases black power rings that reanimate the deceased to recruit members to their ranks. In Green Lantern vol. 4 #45, Larfleeze is shown delighting over his Orange Lanterns attempting to steal the Blue Central Power Battery from Odym. His celebration is premature, however, as black power rings invade his chamber and reanimate the bodies of those whose identities he's stolen to create his constructs. Larfleeze responds to this with a simple and timid "Yuh-oh!" He is next seen fleeing his reanimated Orange Lanterns, distracting him to such a degree that his energy constructs on Odym dissipate. Larfleeze is saved by the timely intervention of Atrocitus, who demands that Larfleeze hand over his power battery. The two characters quarrel over the Orange Central Power Battery before being overwhelmed again by the reanimated corpses of Larfleeze's constructs. They're saved by Saint Walker, Hal Jordan, Carol Ferris, Indigo-1, and Sinestro, who have arrived to recruit them both to assist in destroying the Black Central Power Battery. Both antagonists prove difficult to persuade, with Larfleeze more preoccupied by the other Corps having their own Guardians. To secure his compliance, Sayd agrees to be his personal Guardian at the end of the conflict if he cooperates. Larfleeze agrees and ultimately accompanies the group to Earth, which becomes the setting for the end of the "Blackest Night" event.

During the events that transpire on Earth, Ganthet duplicates Larfleeze's ring to bolster the ranks of the light-wielders against Nekron's forces. The duplicate orange power ring is able to choose someone to become a deputy Orange Lantern for a 24-hour period. Though Larfleeze protests against anyone else's wielding of the orange light, the duplicate ring chooses Lex Luthor as its wearer. Despite the immense conflict going on around them, the two characters repeatedly clash due to their insatiable greed. In the final issue of Blackest Night, Luthor is stripped of his power. Larfleeze hands him over to the heroes of Earth in disgust, prompting Sinestro to point out that this is the first time Larfleeze has given anyone anything. As promised, Sayd agrees to become Larfleeze's personal Guardian when he demands payment for participating in their plan.

Brightest Day

Larfleeze later seeks out Luthor, demanding to know what is important to the people of Earth. Luthor responds with "power" (which Larfleeze already possesses) and "land", which Larfleeze decides he wants. Larfleeze is shown to have taken up residence in a small, upper midwestern town. He sends his Orange Lanterns into town to steal things for him. When Hal Jordan confronts him and tells him to leave the town alone, Larfleeze tells him that he won't need to ransack the town anymore because he has learned of the legend of Santa Claus. Larfleeze intends to make lists of all the things he wants and send them to Santa Claus. When Hal tries to explain to Larfleeze that Santa Claus isn't real, Larfleeze comments that the mountain of stuff that he has stolen is evidence to the contrary. Frustrated, Hal reveals that he has come to Larfleeze to find out how he was able to trap the orange entity in his lantern, so that they can trap the other entities to keep them out of the hands of the one trying to collect them. Before Larfleeze can tell him, Hector Hammond arrives. After struggling with Larfleeze and Hal for the battery, Hammond ends up swallowing it. This frees Ophidian and the entity of avarice takes Hammond as its host. Larfleeze shows a great deal of concern about Ophidian's freedom, particularly because it seems that Ophidian doesn't like him very much. The battle with Ophidian doesn't go very well for Hal or Larfleeze. While fleeing Ophidian, Larfleeze admits that he wasn't entirely honest about his ownership of the orange lantern and that he and Ophidian have a rather antagonistic relationship; however, he is quick to blame Ophidian for starting whatever it was that came between them. Ophidian states that Larfleeze was the only being in the universe capable of resisting his temptations, thereby allowing Larfleeze to subdue him and become Agent Orange, and that now it's Larfleeze's turn to be subdued and used by Ophidian. Ophidian then attempts to devour Larfleeze, but this is prevented by Hal. After that the desires of Hector Hammond begin to override those of Ophidian and he leaves to search for his ultimate desire, Carol Ferris. Hal has to get to Las Vegas to save Carol, and Larfleeze (who is in a state of near hysteria, telling Hal that he can't live without his lantern) demands to come. Once there Larfleeze seems to forget entirely about Ophidian and his lost lantern (which appears to have had no effect on his ability to spawn orange lanterns) and instead revels in the rich culture of Las Vegas. He is stopped by the Predator, who forces him to experience the sadness of his empty heart, briefly causing him to think of his family. He is later taken to Zamaron by the Star Sapphires along with Hal, Carol, The Predator, and Abraham Pointe (the man possessed by the Predator). Larfleeze is present when Carol is named the new Queen of the Star Sapphires, and states that he wants to be queen. While watching over Pointe, Larfleeze is shaken to discover that Pointe knows of his past through the Predator that he was taken from his family, and that "Larfleeze" isn't his real name. Larfleeze almost kills Pointe to keep him from speaking his name, before returning to Earth with the others to meet a young woman who has been possessed by the hope entity, Adara. Adara reveals to a shocked Larfleeze that she senses the empty void within him. Larfleeze claims it's his stomach but Adara dismisses this saying there is a pit inside him he's been trying to fill for centuries. Adara goes on to explain that she's here to give him hope saying that his parents are still alive, and that they miss him. The blue lantern symbol shining in Larfleeze's eyes gives the implication that his avaricious tendencies have been somewhat tempered.

Larfleeze Christmas Special

On Christmas Day, Larfleeze is outraged to discover that Santa Claus hasn't brought him anything that he asked for. He attacks every costumed Santa in the nearby town, and tries to melt the North Pole, only to be stopped by Hal Jordan. Jordan tells Larfleeze of Christmas spirit, and how it comes from giving. On Hal's suggestion, Larfleeze gives away every item in his mountain of possessions, but afterwards declares that he doesn't like Christmas spirit. Jordan then suggests that he look over his Christmas list and see if he actually needed anything there. That night, Larfleeze stares at a part of his list, on which he had written "my family".

War of the Green Lanterns
When Krona's attack traps the other six New Guardians in the Book of the Black, Hal is able to escape with their rings. Although he initially discouraged John Stewart from using the ring due to its psychological effects, Hal later uses Larfleeze's orange ring in conjunction with Sinestro's ring to hold off the attacking brainwashed Green Lanterns long enough for Guy Gardner to break Parallax out of the Central Power Battery and restore their comrades to normal. While trapped inside the Book of the Black, Larfleeze is forced to relive a childhood memory of slavery. Larfleeze is later freed from the book by Kyle Rayner. When his orange ring returns to him, Larfleeze is initially fearful, saying "Keep it away from me!" Once the ring is on his finger, however, he returns to his usual mindset, declaring it "Mine!"

The New 52
In September 2011, The New 52 rebooted DC's continuity. In this new timeline, Kyle Rayner had apparently become a magnet to the other Lantern Corps rings, which forced Kyle to face off with the second-in-commands from the Sinestro Corps, Red Lantern Corps, Earth's Star Sapphires and Indigo Tribe. With the help of Saint Walker from the Blue Lantern Corps, Kyle tried to reach Oa for some answers, but on their way an orange ring approaches Kyle with Saint Walker claiming if there is only one orange ring then its former bearer must be dead. However, Saint Walker had not seen that there are multiple orange rings, just all inactive, as revealed in the prelude to "Blackest Night". It is subsequently revealed that Kyle's orange ring was actually the Glomulus construct posing as a ring when Larfleeze appears to attack the Guardians, claiming that some unknown force attempted to steal his ring and send it to Kyle only for Larfleeze to send Glomulus to investigate when his strong connection to his ring allowed him to retain his hold of it. However, while investigating the Orrery that was apparently responsible for the theft of the rings, Kyle discovers that the worlds were aware of Larfleeze's existence, identifying him as 'the Beast', with their ruler, Archangel Invictus. Archangel Invictus reveals that Larfleeze was responsible for his banishment from the universe centuries ago and seeks revenge. Although Saint Walker assumes that Larfleeze is responsible for the Reach attacking the Blue Lantern Corps, Larfleeze states that he would never do such a thing as it would involve sharing the pleasure of their defeat. Munk- the Indigo Tribe representative of the New Guardians- manages to disrupt Larfleeze's constructs by tapping into the Orange light when Larfleeze attacks the New Guardians, with the regenerated Glomulus actively moving to protect Kyle, but the team are forced to prioritize when Invictus begins to attack the Vega system.

When Kyle Rayner learned that he needed to master all seven emotions of the spectrum to defeat the rise of the Third Army, he approached Larfleeze for aid. Although Larfleeze was initially unwilling to share his power, he consented when Carol Ferris offered to help him find his still-living family in return. Despite this offer, Larfleeze only consents to give Kyle access to his power if Kyle can get past him in a fight and recharge from his Orange battery, although Kyle manages to do this while Larfleeze is occupied fighting off the attacking Third Army. When Larfleeze is captured by Volthoom, the returned 'First Lantern' who sought to wield all powers of the emotional spectrum, Volthoom attempted to trap Larfleeze in various illusionary realities granting his greatest wish- including a world where Larfleeze never fell victim to the Orange light or a world where he successfully stole Hal's blue ring- but these illusions failed due to the extent of the orange ring's influence on Larfleeze.

Following the defeat of the Third Army and Volthoom and the death of the Guardians, Larfleeze agrees to release Sayd so that she can return to Ganthet, Sinestro having spared the two of them from the fate of the other Guardians so long as they never return to Oa. He states that Larfleeze's 'reward' will be knowledge of the secret of Ganthet and Sayd's survival. In the future, the Keeper of the Corps' history states that, eventually, Larfleeze will give away everything he has to regain his family, but will return to old habits eventually.

DC Rebirth
Larfleeze was shown in Hal Jordan and the Green Lantern Corps #10 (2016) to be controlling Brainiac 2.0 after the latter had managed to trap planet Xudar with Green and Yellow lanterns in it.

Powers and abilities

Larfleeze's exclusively wields the orange light of avarice using his orange power ring and power battery. Some of his basic abilities are shared with other Corps: flight, aura projection, and the ability to create constructs made from light. However, the most notable and unique aspect of Larfleeze's abilities is his power to steal the identities of those he kills. After these individuals have died, orange light constructs resembling them rise from their corpses, adding new members to his Orange Lanterns. The Orange Lanterns are able to steal the identities of others for Larfleeze in the same way. The orange light also has the power to absorb green light constructs and mystical energies (such as the magicks created by Green Lantern Torquemada). Conversely, it is depicted as being unable to absorb blue or violet light constructs. When Larfleeze faced the New Guardians - a team consisting of representatives from all six of the other Corps - the only Lantern able to damage his constructs was Munk of the Indigo Tribe, which was only accomplished when Munk tapped into the Orange light himself.

Larfleeze's power is amplified by being in constant contact with his power battery. As a result of this, he can maintain an entire corps of constructs, even when separated from it. His control over his ring is so great that he was the only being able to retain control of his ring when a mysterious external force turned Kyle Rayner into a 'ring magnet' that caused the rings of one member from each of the other five Corps to abandon their wielders and travel to Kyle. However, Larfleeze is burdened with insatiable hunger that is never quelled as a side-effect of wielding the orange light (which can be nullified while in the presence of a Blue Lantern).

Based on Larfleeze's reaction to it after it was removed, the Orange ring is classified as one of the two parasitic type rings (the other is the Indigo Ring), which alters its wielder to match its own alignment rather than choosing users who embody its emotion. Unlike the Indigo ring, it appears to need someone who is already somewhat greedy; it then amplifies this to a huge degree, as shown in Larfleeze origin where he kills two of his fellow thieves to gain control of the ring. It would appear that, unlike the Indigo Tribe, Larfleeze retains some awareness while under the ring's influence, as he clearly recognized the ring when he was temporarily freed of it while Indigo 1 appeared ignorant of what had happened to her. When briefly free of his ring, Larfleeze is terrified of it, and begs not to have it returned. As soon as the ring is back on his finger, his previous mindset returns.

Orange Lantern Corps

Other versions
The Lightsmith
In the universe prior to the current one, groups managed to tap into the wellspring of power created by the Emotional Spectrum. In this universe those who tapped into the orange light were known as the Lightsmiths of the Orange Light of Gluttony.

Star Trek/Green Lantern: The Spectrum War
In a possible future, when Nekron launches a new assault on the universe, rapidly recruiting the dead as his agents against the living as his forces claim even more lives, Ganthet triggers a 'last light' protocol that uses the last of his energy to send himself, the rings of six of the seven Corps (Minus a Green Lantern ring) and the last surviving members of the seven Corps to another universe to try and escape Nekron's assault, the various ring-wielders and the rings arriving in the new Star Trek universe. Although the Blue, Violet and Indigo rings find wielders in Pavel Chekov, Nyota Uhura and Leonard McCoy, the Yellow, Red, and Orange rings choose Klingon general Chang, a Gorn leader and a Romulan councillor as their wielders. As Larfleeze tracks down the wielder of the other Orange ring, he is impressed at the Romulan councillor's plans of conquest, but is unaware that Nekron was drawn into this new universe along with the rings, Nekron 'manifesting' at the site of Vulcan's destruction. As the conflict escalates, the Romulan confronts the other ring-wielders in a mass confrontation, but when the Enterprise crew confront Nekron, Kirk realises that Spock is the only person capable of wielding all seven rings, with his shipmates transferring their rings to him and the other three automatically travelling to Spock, abandoning their hosts in the process. After Nekron's defeat, Kirk muses that Larfleeze is still out there in the universe, and they will have to search for him in future.

In other media
Television
 Larfleeze appears in Green Lantern: The Animated Series episode "Larfleeze" voiced by Dee Bradley Baker. Dialogue also identifies Glomulus as one of his constructs. In the episode, Razer tells Kilowog and Hal Jordan of the Orange light, and the three decide to seek it to fight their former ally Aya, who has taken over the body and duties of the Anti-Monitor. Finding the Orange power battery, Hal becomes close to it and steals it from an enraged Larfleeze, who calls it his "shiny". As they are about to leave, Jordan becomes paranoid that Kilowog and Razer were planning to take the lantern from him, and after succumbing to the Orange light's power, becomes an Orange Lantern himself. With Larfleeze's aid, Kilowog and Razer try to make Jordan come to his senses, only succeeding when they convince him to reject the Orange light in favor of saving the universe from Aya. Knowing that the Orange light is too powerful for them to use, Jordan returns the lantern to Larfleeze. He tries to reward them, but is too greedy to part with anything of his, prompting the three Lanterns to simply leave.

Video games
 Larfleeze (alongside his Orange Lanterns) appears in DC Universe Online, voiced by Robert S. Fisher. In a Christmas-themed mission, Hal Jordan (heroes) and Sinestro (villains) inform the players that Larfleeze and his Orange Lanterns are stealing holiday-related things to keep to themselves. The players had to recover the stolen goods while fighting Orange Lanterns and Orange Lantern Behemoths. Some of the stolen presents actually contain Orange Lantern booby traps that vary from being stunned, being trapped in an Orange Lantern snowglobe construct, being turned into an Orange Lantern Snowman and can even force any players near one of the booby traps to do the Snoopy dance from the Christmas special A Charlie Brown Christmas.
 Larfleeze appears as an antagonist and summonable character in Scribblenauts Unmasked: A DC Comics Adventure.
Larfleeze appears as a playable character in Lego Batman 3: Beyond Gotham, voiced by Dee Bradley Baker.
 Larfleeze appears as a playable character in DC Unchained.
 Larfleeze appears as a playable character in the mobile game DC Legends''.

Toys
 Larfleeze was featured in the Blackest Night series of the DC Comics Super Hero Collection.
 A six-inch figure of Larfleeze was a part of the Blackest Night toyline.
 Larfleeze has also been released as part of Mattel's DC Universe Signature Series of action figures through MattyCollector.Com. He is the April 2013 figure.

References

Comics characters introduced in 2008
DC Comics aliens
DC Comics characters who can move at superhuman speeds
DC Comics characters with superhuman strength
DC Comics extraterrestrial supervillains
Green Lantern characters
Characters created by Geoff Johns
Characters created by Ethan Van Sciver
Anthropomorphic animals
Fictional characters who can manipulate reality
Fictional characters with energy-manipulation abilities 
Fictional characters who can manipulate light
Fictional characters with immortality
Fictional characters with elemental transmutation abilities
Fictional characters with death or rebirth abilities
Fictional characters with weather abilities
Supervillains with their own comic book titles